Kevin Killer (Oglala Sioux) (born May 4, 1979) is an activist, Native American politician, and former president of the Oglala Sioux Tribe. He previously served as a Democratic member of the South Dakota House of Representatives from 2009 to 2017 and the South Dakota Senate from 2017 to 2019, representing the 27th district. He lives in Pine Ridge, South Dakota. In November 2020, he was elected tribal president of the Oglala Sioux Tribe. He was defeated during his 2022 re-election bid by Frank Star Comes Out.

Early life and education
Killer grew up in Denver, Colorado, where his father, Francis, was a CPA and a member of the Oglala Sioux Tribe. His mother, Janice, is from the Kiowa tribe of Oklahoma. When young, Killer returned to his father's people on the Pine Ridge Indian Reservation every summer, in order to know them and the land. His father died when Killer was 20, but he was helped by mentors.

Killer graduated from Oglala Lakota College. His first experience in politics came in 2004, working for former United States Senator Tom Daschle. He was the first Tribal College Fellow for Young People For, a youth leadership development organization, and worked to expand the group's tribal college network into a Native-American-led group called the Native Youth Leadership Alliance in 2009.

Career
Killer was first elected to the state legislature in 2008 where he served on the House State Affairs Committee, which has an important role in moving legislation forward, and its Judicial Affairs Committee. In 2016 he was elected to the State Senate from District 27 and in the year prior, 2015, was a Bush Fellow.

He is also director of the Native American Youth Leadership Alliance, a role he began in 2010 and which sees to his working to build youth leaders among the people of the reservations. Killer has noted that a high percentage of residents on the reservations are under age 18. In 2019, Killer became a senior fellow at Prism. He is noted as being the co-founder of Advance Native Political Leadership, a non-profit that aims to expand indigenous representation in elected and appointed offices across the United States.

Concurrent to his political work, Killer has been involved as an actor and executive producer on two short films, Running Shadow and Istinma.

References

External links
 
 Twitter account

1979 births
21st-century American politicians
Living people
Democratic Party members of the South Dakota House of Representatives
Native American state legislators in South Dakota
Oglala Sioux Tribe politicians
Kiowa people
People from Pine Ridge, South Dakota